Bonarcado is a comune (municipality) in the Province of Oristano in the Italian region Sardinia, located about  northwest of Cagliari and about  north of Oristano.

Bonarcado borders the following municipalities: Bauladu, Milis, Paulilatino, Santu Lussurgiu, Seneghe.

Wildfire 2021

References

Cities and towns in Sardinia